Cilibia was an Ancient city and bishopric in Roman North Africa, which remains a Latin Catholic titular see.

History 
Cilibia, probably at the site of Henchir-Kelbia in present Tunisia, was among the many cities in the Roman province of Africa Proconsularis that were important enough to become a suffragan diocese of the Metropolitan of Carthage, in the papal sway.

Three of its bishops are historically documented, including a schismatic:
 Tertullus was among the Donatist heretical bishops attending the council of Carthage called in 411 by Western Roman emperor Honorius, where their Catholic counterparts saw Donatism condemned
 Restitutus attended the Synod of Carthage (525)
 Johannes (John) participated in the Council of Carthage (646).

Titular see 
The diocese was nominally restored in 1933 as Latin titular bishopric of Cilibia (Latin = Curiate Italian) /  (Latin adjective).

It has had the following incumbents, of the fitting episcopal (lowest) rank:
 Víctor Manuel López Forero (1985.06.07 – 1994.06.21) as last Military Vicar of Colombia (Colombia) (1985.06.07 – 1986.07.21) and (see) restyled first Military Ordinary of Colombia (1986.07.21 – 1994.06.21); previously Titular Bishop of Afufenia (1977.05.06 – 1980.12.06) as Auxiliary Bishop of Archdiocese of Bogotá (Colombia) (1977.05.06 – 1980.12.06), Bishop of Socorro y San Gil (Colombia) (1980.12.06 – 1985.06.07); later Metropolitan Archbishop of Nueva Pamplona (Colombia) (1994.06.21 – 1998.06.27), Metropolitan Archbishop of Bucaramanga (Colombia) (1998.06.27 – resigned 2009.02.13), Apostolic Administrator of above Socorro y San Gil (2009.05 – 2010.02.02), Apostolic Administrator of Diocese of Montelíbano (Colombia) (2010.09 – retired 2012.02.02)
 Javier Echevarría Rodríguez (Spaniard) (1994.04.20 – 2016.12.12) as (second) Prelate (in charge, like a superior general) of the personal prelature Opus Dei (Italy) (1994.04.20 – 2016.12.12) and Grand Chancellor of Pontifical University of the Holy Cross (1994.04.20 – 2016.12.12)
 Eduard Kava (Ukrainian), O.F.M. Conv. (2017.05.13 – ...), Auxiliary Bishop of the Archdiocese of Lviv (Ukraine) (2017.05.13 – ...).

See also 
 List of Catholic dioceses in Tunisia

References 

 Bibliography
 Pius Bonifacius Gams, Series episcoporum Ecclesiae Catholicae, Leipzig 1931, p. 465
 Stefano Antonio Morcelli, Africa christiana, Volume I, Brescia 1816, p. 139
 J. Mesnage, L'Afrique chrétienne, Paris 1912, p. 93
 J. Ferron, lemma 'Cilibiensis', in Dictionnaire d'Histoire et de Géographie ecclésiastiques, vol. XII, Paris 1953, coll. 830-831

Catholic titular sees in Africa
Suppressed Roman Catholic dioceses